Bart Zeilstra, better known by his stage name Baas B (born 10 April 1982), is a Dutch rapper and singer who was a founding member of Dutch rap formation D-Men and between 1997 and 2009, a member of the Dutch hip hop duo Lange Frans & Baas B both formed with his childhood friend Frans Frederiks better known as Lange Frans. After the split-up of the duo, he is working as a solo artist; the duo eventually reformed in 2019.

Career

In D-Men

In 1997, Zeilstra was a founding member of a band alongside rapper siblings Lange Frans and Brutus Frederiks as he was a childhood friend of the two. After a freestyle session on a basketball court in Diemen-Zuid, they created hiphop collective D-Men. The English pronunciation of "D-Men" is similar to the Dutch pronunciation of the name of their home town. As D-Men they released their first single entitled "Zoveel Mensen" ("So Many People"), and in 2001, they won a talent contest that was organised by Stichting Grap ("Joke Foundation") in 2001. In later years, many artists joined D-Men, namely Brace, Yes-R & Soesi B, Negativ and DJ MBA.

In Lange Frans and Baas B

In 2004, Zeilstra and Frans already in D-Men formed the duo Lange Frans & Baas B and had a successful career for more than 4 years with three albums Supervisie (2004), Het land van (2005) and Verder (2008) and a number of singles the most successful of which were "Moppie", "Zinloos" both in 2004 and "Mee naar Diemen-Zuid" in 2005. After the murder of Theo van Gogh on 2 November 2004 the single "Zinloos" was adapted and some of the lyrics amended to mourn in death. The band split up in March 2009.

The duo came under criticism for over-commercialization of his music from D-Men colleague Negativ and from other Dutch rappers Def P and Kimo.

They had their last appearance on an edition of the Dutch X Factor where they lost a rap battle against Marcel Machielse & Pim Ottenheim

Solo career

Baas B had a prosperous career as a solo artist. His 2005 single "Stel je voor" featuring rapper Yes-R reached No. 3 in the Dutch Singles Chart, whereas his single "Waar ik sta" featuring Jayh topped the Dutch Singles Chart.

He also moved into feature films and made voiceover over the Dutch version of the animated film Cars taking the voices of Snotrod and DJ while Lange Frans made the voiceovers for Boost and Wingo

Discography

Albums

Singles

References

1982 births
Living people
Dutch rappers
Musicians from Amsterdam